Gillian Sze is a Canadian writer. She has won one Quebec Writers' Federation Award and been a finalist seven times across four different categories.

Biography 
Sze's parents are Chinese immigrants, and she grew up speaking the Hokkien dialect of Mandarin at home. She was raised in Winnipeg. 

After graduating from high school, Sze studied at the University of Winnipeg for one year to study medicine, after which she transferred to Concordia University to study creative writing. She later received a Master of Arts in creative writing from Concordia University, as well as a Ph.D. in English Studies from the Université de Montréal. 

Sze presently lives in Montreal. Since 2017, she has worked in the English Department at John Abbott College.

Awards and honours 
My Love for You is Aways received a starred review from Kirkus Reviews. 

The Night is Deep and Wide received a starred review from Publishers Weekly. The book was also named one of the best children's books of the year by New York Public Library (2021) and Carnegie Library of Pittsburgh (2022).

The Globe and Mail included Quiet Night Think: Poems & Essays in their list of the best 100 books of 2022. CBC Books also included in on their "Best Canadian Poetry of 2022" list.

Publications

Children's books 

 My Love for You Is Always, illustrated by Michelle Lee (2021, Philomel, ISBN: 9780593203071)
 The Night Is Deep and Wide, illustrated by Sue Todd (2021, Orca Books, ISBN: 9781459824812)
 You Are My Favorite Color, illustrated by Niña Mata (2022, Philomel, ISBN: 9780593203101)
 When Sunlight Tiptoes, illustrated by Soyeon Kim (2023, Orca Book Publishers, ISBN: 9781459834507)
 The Little Green Envelope, illustrated by Claudine Crangle (2023, Groundwood)

Poetry 

 Fish Bones (2009, DC Books, ISBN: 9781897190494)
 The Anatomy of Clay (2011, ECW Press, ISBN: 9781770410145)
 Peeling Rambutan (2014, Gaspereau Press, ISBN: 9781554471331)
 Fricatives (2015, Gaspereau Press, ISBN: 9781554471539)
 Redrafting Winter, with Alison Strumberger (2015, BuschekBooks, ISBN: 9781894543859)
 Panicle (2017, Misfit Book, ISBN: 9781770414051)
 Quiet Night Think: Poems & Essays (2022, Misfit Book, ISBN: 9781770416253)

References

External links 

 Official website

Living people
21st-century Canadian poets
21st-century Canadian women writers
Concordia University alumni
Université de Montréal alumni
Writers from Winnipeg